Airborne Wind Energy Industry Association (AWEIA) was founded in 2009 to serve globally companies and institutions dedicated to converting wind energy for useful loads (airborne wind energy technology) by use of tethered and free-flight aircraft (airborne wind energy AWE); the tethered and free-flight mode is in contrast to using non-tethered ground-connected wind turbines. Founders: Dave Santos, Joe Faust, John Oyebanji, and Wayne German. AWEIA is a member of Global Wind Energy Council. AWEIA is the first global-serving member of GWEC dedicated to airborne wind energy technology.

See also 
 High altitude wind power
 Airborne wind turbines
 List of airborne wind energy organizations

References 

Wind energy organizations
Airborne wind power